Matadi is a commune of the city of Matadi in the Democratic Republic of the Congo.

Populated places in Kongo Central
Communes of the Democratic Republic of the Congo